The House of Czetwertyński or Chetvertynsky (also Czetwertyński-Światopełk and Sviatopolk-Chetvertynsky) is a Polish princely family of Ruthenian origin that was founded in modern-day Volhynia within the Crown of the Kingdom of Poland, now Ukraine. The family takes its name from the village of Chetvertnia, Lutsk county, in modern-day Manevychi Raion, Volyn Oblast.

History
According to the family's legend, the progenitor of the family is the Grand Prince of Kyiv, Sviatopolk II. The first documented member of the family is Oleksander Chetvertynsky, who is mentioned in 1388. The family was accepted into the princely houses of Poland and Lithuania in 1569 and their Russian title of prince was confirmed in 1843.

In 1492, Prince Fedir Mykhailovych Chetvertynsky was the Lithuanian-Ruthenian ambassador to Wallachia. Over time, the family were Polonized and Catholicized, but some members remained adherent to the Eastern Orthodox religion.

Prince Stepan Sviatopolk-Chetvertynsky (1575–1659) played a key role in re-establishing the Ukrainian Orthodox Church of the Ecumenical Patriarchate of Constantinople in 1620. His son Mykola Sviatopolk-Chetvertynsky (?–1659) was a relative of the Hetman of Zaporizhian Host, Ivan Vyhovsky.

Two of the most notable representatives of the family were Hedeon Zakharovych Svyatopolk-Chetvertynsky, the Metropolitan of Kyiv, Galicia and all Little Russia in 1685–90, and Antoni Stanislaw's daughter Marie, who was Alexander I of Russia's mistress and had children by him. A nephew of Hedeon, Yurii Sviatopolk-Chetvertynsky (?-c. 1717–22), was a son-in-law of the Hetman of Zaporizhian Host, Ivan Samoylovych.

After Antoni Stanisław Czetwertyński-Światopełk was lynched in 1794 by Polish nationals in Warsaw during the Kościuszko Uprising, his family resettled in Saint Petersburg, in the Russian Empire. It received major land grants from Catherine the Great, such as the manor of Filimonki near Moscow.

Belgian branch 
By royal decree of King Albert II of Belgium, two members (both sons of Prince Michel Felix Swiatopelk-Czetwertynski) were recognised in the Belgian nobility with the rank of Prince, for them and their male-line descendants.

 Alexandre Wladimir (Alex), Prince Swiatopelk-Czetwertynski (Ukkel, 27 December 1975), married to Christine Renée Harrington
 Constantin Nicolas (Tinko), Prince Swiatopelk-Czetwertynski (Brussels, 20 February 1978), a portrait and fashion photographer known as "Tinko Czetwertynski", married to model and product designer Princess Paola Maria Sapieha-Rozanska (London, 27 April 1983), daughter of Prince Jan Pavel Sapieha-Rozanski (1950-2021), former Belgian ambassador to Brazil and Princess Cristina of Orléans-Braganza (b. 1950)

Coat of arms
The family used the Pogoń Ruska coat of arms.

Notable members 
 Antoni Stanisław Czetwertyński-Światopełk
 Gedeon Chetvertinsky, became a first Metropolitan of Kyiv appointed by Moscow in 1685
 Seweryn Franciszek Światopełk-Czetwertyński

Palaces

References

External links
 Swiatopolk-Czetwertynski family website
 Genealogia książąt Czetwertyńskich i Sokolskich

 
Belgian noble families
Roman Catholic families
Polish noble families
Lithuanian nobility
Belarusian nobility